Mladost Hall is a multi-purpose indoor arena located in Karlovac, Croatia. Its capacity is 2,800 and it is mostly used for handball matches as the home ground of HRK Karlovac. In the past it was also home ground for famous, now defunct, basketball team KK Željezničar Karlovac.

It hosted 1970 FIBA World Championship and Eurobasket 1975.

External links
Official page

Indoor arenas in Croatia
Karlovac
Buildings and structures in Karlovac County